Turicimonas is a genus of bacteria from the family of Sutterellaceae with one known species (Turicimonas muris). Turicimonas muris has been isolated from the caecal content of a mouse.

References

Burkholderiales
Bacteria genera
Monotypic bacteria genera